Utah State Route 89 may refer to:

 Utah State Route 89, the legislative overlay designation for U.S. Route 189 (US-189) within Utah, United States. By Utah State law, US-189 within the state (except concurrencies) has been defined as "State Route 189" since 1977)
 Utah State Route 89 (1975-1977), a former state route in the Ogden Valley in eastern Weber County, Utah, United States, that connected Utah State Route 162 (now Utah State Route 158) at a junction in the Wasatch-Cache National Forest (north of the Pineview Reservoir) with Utah State Route 166 (now Utah State Route 162) in Eden. (The route was renumbered as Utah State route 169 in 1977.)
 Utah State Route 89 (1935-1953), a short former state route in southwestern Summit County, Utah, United States, that connected Utah State Route 35 in Francis with the former Utah State Route 151 at the Driscoll Dugway (East Lower River Road) south of Francis

See also

 List of state highways in Utah
 List of U.S. Highways in Utah
 List of named highway junctions in Utah
 List of highways numbered 89

External links

 Utah Department of Transportation Highway Resolutions: Route 89 (PDF)